Charlotte Beers is an American businesswoman and former Under Secretary of State for Public Diplomacy and Public Affairs in the George W. Bush Administration.

Beers was the first female vice-president at the JWT advertising firm, then CEO of Tatham-Laird & Kudner until 1992, and finally CEO of Ogilvy & Mather until 1996. In 1997, Fortune magazine placed her on the cover of their first issue to feature the most powerful women in America, for her achievements in the advertising industry. In 1999, Beers received the "Legend in Leadership Award" from the Chief Executive Leadership Institute of the Yale School of Management. As an advertising executive, she ran a number of prominent ad campaigns for national brands including Uncle Ben’s rice and American Express.

From October 2001 until March 2003, she worked for the Bush Administration as the Under Secretary for Public Diplomacy and Public Affairs in the aftermath of the 9/11 attacks.

In 2002, Beers worked for the U.S. State Department to produce propaganda videos intending to sell a “new” America to Muslims around the world by showing that American Muslims were living happily and freely in post-9/11 America. The $15 million Shared Values Initiative produced five mini-documentaries for television, radio, and print with shared values messages for key Muslim countries. Less than a month after the release of the Shared Values Initiative, the State Department abruptly discontinued it.

Beers attended Baylor University and graduated from the University of Louisiana at Lafayette, then called the University of Southwestern Louisiana, with a bachelor of science in liberal arts. She grew up in Beaumont, Texas.

References

External links 
Texas Monthly: Advertising • Charlotte Beers

Living people
Marketing people
American marketing people
American women in business
University of Louisiana at Lafayette alumni
Baylor University alumni
Marketing women
United States Under Secretaries of State
WPP plc people
Women in advertising
21st-century American women
Year of birth missing (living people)